Shangzhou (商州镇) is a town in Yibin County, Sichuan, China. 

Towns in Sichuan
Administrative divisions of Yibin